Sa Sandaling Kailangan Mo Ako is a Philippine prime time television drama weekly short-lived miniseries aired on ABS-CBN every Monday. It aired from November 16, 1998 to September 6, 1999. It was replaced by Judy Ann Drama Special.

The series re-aired on Kapamilya Channel (now S+A) from 2007 to 2008.

Cast
Marvin Agustin as Ruben Morales
Kristine Hermosa as Agnes
Piolo Pascual as Raffy Enriquez
G. Toengi as Stella
John Lloyd Cruz as Jojo
Kaye Abad as Eloisa Morales
Dante Rivero as Julio Morales
Hilda Koronel as Dolor Morales
Ronaldo Valdez as Ramon Enriquez
Tessie Tomas as Sonia Enriquez
Tracy Vergel as Margarita Enriquez
William Lorenzo as Chito

Gallery

See also
List of programs broadcast by ABS-CBN

Philippine television miniseries
ABS-CBN drama series
1998 Philippine television series debuts
1999 Philippine television series endings
1990s television miniseries
Filipino-language television shows